Ryszard Malcherczyk (born 17 October 1934) is a retired triple jumper from Poland.

He was born in Zabrze and represented the club Legia Warszawa. He finished tenth at the 1956 Olympic Games and sixth at the 1960 Olympic Games.

He became Polish champion in 1961 and 1964. His personal best jump was 16.53 metres, achieved in 1961.

References

1934 births
Living people
Sportspeople from Zabrze
Polish male triple jumpers
Polish athletics coaches
Athletes (track and field) at the 1956 Summer Olympics
Athletes (track and field) at the 1960 Summer Olympics
Olympic athletes of Poland